17 Poems is a 1954 poetry collection by the Swedish writer Tomas Tranströmer. It was Tranströmer's debut book: he had previously only been published in journals. The book was well received in the Swedish press and praised for its formal confidence and imagination in metaphors.

Several of the poems in 17 poems have been set to music.

See also
 1954 in poetry
 Swedish literature

References

1954 poetry books
Poetry by Tomas Tranströmer
Swedish poetry collections
Albert Bonniers Förlag books